Betrayal is a 1983 British drama film adaptation of Harold Pinter's 1978 play of the same name. With a semi-autobiographical screenplay by Pinter, the film was produced by Sam Spiegel and directed by David Jones. It was critically well received. Distributed by 20th Century Fox International Classics (USA), it was first screened in movie theaters in New York in February 1983.

Plot

Betrayal follows significant moments in the seven-year extramarital affair of art gallery owner Emma with literary agent Jerry, the best friend of her husband Robert, a London publisher. Nine sequences are shown in reverse chronological order with Emma and Jerry meeting for the first time at the conclusion of the film.

Cast
Jeremy Irons as Jerry
Ben Kingsley as Robert
Patricia Hodge as Emma
Avril Elgar as Mrs. Banks
Ray Marioni as Waiter
Caspar Norman as Sam
Chloe Billington as Charlotte, age five
Hannah Davies as Charlotte, age nine
Michael König as Ned, age two
Alexander McIntosh as Ned, age five

Production
Screenwriter Harold Pinter based the drama on his seven-year (1962–69) clandestine affair with television presenter Joan Bakewell, who was married to producer-director Michael Bakewell. At the time, Pinter was married to actress Vivien Merchant.

Reception
New York Times film critic Vincent Canby said Harold Pinter is "justifiably celebrated" and that "nothing he has written for the stage has ever been as simply and grandly realized on the screen as his Betrayal". He applauded the performances of the three lead actors, the direction, and the meaningful application of reverse chronology, and summed up that "I can't think of another recent film that is simultaneously so funny, so moving and so rigorously unsentimental. ... This is pure Pinter well served by collaborators." Chicago Sun-Times film critic Roger Ebert similarly commented that the film's reverse chronology, far from being a gimmick, is the key element to its brilliance. He gave the movie four stars.

Dave Kehr of the Chicago Reader, by contrast, argued that "The reverse-order gimmick of Harold Pinter's screenplay seems meant to revitalize some trite and tedious material—the breakup of a love affair—yet the expected literary games don't materialize: the film plods backward in time with the same dull linearity it would have moving forward." He praised Kingsley's performance but gave the film an overall negative assessment. Geoff Andrew likewise wrote in Time Out, "Hodge is fine, Kingsley tries his best, and Irons is as tight-assed as ever. But it's all so uncinematic as to make one wonder why it was ever made in the first place." Variety commented that Patricia Hodge gave a much less compelling performance than the other two leads but summed up the film as "an absorbing, quietly amusing chamber drama for those attuned to Harold Pinter’s way with words."

Accolades

Notes

References

External links

1983 films
1983 drama films
20th Century Fox films
American drama films
British films based on plays
British drama films
Films directed by David Jones
Films with screenplays by Harold Pinter
Films produced by Sam Spiegel
Films about infidelity
1980s English-language films
1980s American films
1980s British films
English-language drama films